Aschistophleps is a genus of moths in the family Sesiidae.

Species
Aschistophleps argentifasciata Skowron Volponi & Volponi, 2018
Aschistophleps bicella (Xu & Arita, 2015)
Aschistophleps cruentata (Swinhoe, 1896)
Aschistophleps cucphuonganae (Arita & Gorbunov, 2000)
Aschistophleps ellawi (Skowron Volponi, 2017)
Aschistophleps haematochrodes Le Cerf, 1912
Aschistophleps ignisquamulata Kallies & Štolc, 2018
Aschistophleps lampropoda Hampson, 1892
Aschistophleps longipoda Arita & Gorbunov, 2000
Aschistophleps nigripennis (Arita & Gorbunov, 2000)
Aschistophleps ruficrista (Rothschild, 1912)
Aschistophleps vitripennis (Arita & Gorbunov, 2000)
Aschistophleps xanthocrista Gorbunov & Arita, 1995

References

Sesiidae